Nubara  is island  in Papua New Guinea.

Geography 
The land of Nubara Island is flat.  The highest point on the island is 17 meters above sea level.  Island stretches about 1.3 km from the north to the south and 1.5 km from the east to the west. In total island covers about 0.70 square kilometers.

References

Islands of Papua New Guinea
Islands Region (Papua New Guinea)